Cochylis defessana is a species of moth of the family Tortricidae. It is found in Bulgaria, Romania, Greece, China (Xinjiang), Iran and Turkey.

The wingspan is 9–15 mm. Adults are on wing from July to August.

The larvae feed on Centaurea divergens. Larvae can be found from May to July.

References

Moths described in 1861
Cochylis